The R364 road is a regional road in County Galway, Ireland connecting Moylough on the N63 to near Ballymoe on the N60.

The official definition of the R364 from the Roads Act 1993 (Classification of Regional Roads) Order 2006  states:

R364: Moylough - Ballymoe, County Galway

Between its junction with N63 at Moylough and its junction with R360 at Knockogonnell via Annaghmore West, Kilkerrin, Glenamaddy, Classaghroe and Ballyglass South all in the county of Galway.

See also
Roads in Ireland
National primary road
National secondary road

References

External links
 Route on Google Maps

Regional roads in the Republic of Ireland
Roads in County Galway